Mayne Island Water Aerodrome, formerly , is a defunct aerodrome that was located at Miners Bay adjacent to Mayne Island in British Columbia, Canada. Mayne Island is one of the southern Gulf Islands.

Airlines and destinations
Although the aerodrome is no longer registered with Transport Canada and is classified as defunct it still has scheduled flights. In this case defunct means that it no longer meets Transport Canada standards, not that the area is no longer in operation.

History 
The dock was constructed at an unspecified time in the 20th century. It was built to harbor boats and serve as a communal fishing area. Some time around 2000 the aerodrome portion was built.

See also
 List of airports in the Gulf Islands

References

Defunct seaplane bases in British Columbia
Transport in the Capital Regional District
Airports in the Gulf Islands